The 1963 Gent–Wevelgem was the 25th edition of the Gent–Wevelgem cycle race and was held on 24 March 1963. The race started in Ghent and finished in Wevelgem. The race was won by Benoni Beheyt of the Groene Leeuw team.

General classification

References

Gent–Wevelgem
1963 in road cycling
1963 in Belgian sport
March 1963 sports events in Europe